Daniel K. Tabor,  is an American politician who served as mayor of Inglewood, California, the third African-American to hold the position.

Biography
Tabor was raised in Inglewood graduated from Morningside High School. After college, he worked as counsellor in Inglewood schools.

Tabor served as the Southern California Liaison for the Office of the Secretary, United States Department of Commerce, under Secretary Ronald H. Brown from 1993 to 1996. He was a negotiator of the settlement agreement between Los Angeles World Airports (LAWA) and the LAX Coalition for Economic, Environmental and Educational justice which brought $500 million in investments to local communities. He served on the Inglewood City Council representing the 1st District from 2002 to 2010. He was instrumental in easing tensions between the declining African-American population and the increasing Hispanic population which had led to a sharp increase in gang violence (Inglewood was 50% Hispanic and 43% African-American in 2010). In 2008, he brought the feuding groups together for a "Day of Dialogue."

On January 24, 2010, the prior mayor of Inglewood, Roosevelt F. Dorn, stepped down from the position and pled guilty the following day to a misdemeanor conflict of interest charge. In August 2010, Tabor won a runoff election to fill the remainder of Dorn's term besting his nearest opponent, 2nd District Council member Judy Dunlap. He was officially sworn-in on September 14, 2010, inheriting a $15 million fiscal deficit. In the November 2, 2010 general election, he earned 43.2 percent of the vote compared with 31.0 percent for the next candidate, James T. Butts Jr.  As he did not obtain a majority of the votes cast, a runoff election was scheduled in January 2011. Tabor lost by a vote of 3,776 to 3,000 and Butts was sworn-in on January 27, 2011. The Los Angeles Sentinel described it as a "tumultuous year of elections" for the city, with a close race between the two candidates while the city was operating at an $18 million deficit.

Tabor is a member of Kappa Alpha Psi fraternity.

References

Living people
Mayors of Inglewood, California
African-American mayors in California
African-American people in California politics
People from Inglewood, California
Year of birth missing (living people)
21st-century African-American people